Jevon Dicorious Langford (born February 16, 1974) is a former professional American football player who played defensive end for six seasons for the Cincinnati Bengals.

References

1974 births
Living people
Players of American football from Washington, D.C.
American football defensive ends
Oklahoma State Cowboys football players
Cincinnati Bengals players
Archbishop Carroll High School (Washington, D.C.) alumni